The Rural Municipality of Arlington No. 79 is a rural municipality (RM) in the Canadian province of Saskatchewan within Census Division No. 4 and  Division No. 3. It is located in the southwestern region of the province east of Shaunavon.

History 
The RM of Arlington No. 79 incorporated as a rural municipality on January 1, 1913.

Geography

Communities and localities 
The following unincorporated communities are within the RM.

Localities
Dollard
South Fork

Pine Cree Regional Park 
Pine Cree Regional Park is a park in the RM, just north of the Highway 13 and 633 junction between Shaunavon and Eastend.

The park was officially founded as a regional park in 1970 as a small natural environment park. Prior to being a regional park, Everett Baker began developing the area in the 1950s as a place for people to go to appreciate nature. The formation of the park was to commemorate Everett Baker and Irish-Canadian naturalist John Macoun, with the Geological Survey of Canada. John Macoun had camped extensively in the area in the 1880s.

The park is situated alongside Swift Current Creek and features 27-nonserviced campsites, a picnic area, hiking, a camp kitchen, and wildlife viewing.

Demographics 

Government 
The RM of Arlington No. 79 is governed by an elected municipal council and an appointed administrator that meets on the second Wednesday of every month. The reeve of the RM is Donald Lundberg while its administrator is Richard Goulet. The RM's office is located in Shaunavon.

Transportation

See also 
List of rural municipalities in Saskatchewan

References 

Arlington
Division No. 4, Saskatchewan